Mycterophora rubricans is a species of moth in the family Erebidae first described by William Barnes and James Halliday McDunnough in 1918. It is found in North America.

References

Further reading

 
 
 

Boletobiinae
Articles created by Qbugbot
Moths described in 1918